The 2015 Copa Libertadores de América Finals were the two-legged final that decided the winner of the 2015 Copa Libertadores de América, the 56th edition of the Copa Libertadores de América, South America's premier international club football tournament organized by CONMEBOL.

The finals were contested in two-legged home-and-away format between Mexican team UANL and Argentine team River Plate. The first leg was hosted by UANL at Estadio Universitario in San Nicolás de los Garza on 29 July 2015, while the second leg was hosted by River Plate at Estadio Antonio Vespucio Liberti in Buenos Aires on 5 August 2015.

Club Atlético River Plate earned the right to represent CONMEBOL at the 2015 FIFA Club World Cup, entering at the semifinal stage, regardless of the result of the final, due to UANL being an invited team from CONCACAF and therefore not eligible to represent CONMEBOL at the tournament. Due to the same reason, River Plate also earned the right to play against the 2015 Copa Sudamericana winners in the 2016 Recopa Sudamericana.

The first leg ended in a scoreless draw. The second leg ended in a 3–0 win for River Plate, and they won the tournament for the third time in their history.

Teams

UANL came into the finals as first-time finalists of the Copa Libertadores. River Plate had previously won two titles in four finals: 1986 and 1996.

Road to the finals

Note: In all scores below, the score of the home team is given first.

Format
The finals were played on a home-and-away two-legged basis. If tied on aggregate, the away goals rule would not be used, and 30 minutes of extra time would be played. If still tied after extra time, the penalty shoot-out would be used to determine the winner.

Since UANL are from Mexico, they had to host the first leg regardless of seeding (Regulations Article 3.7b: "El Torneo deberá indefectiblemente finalizar en un país perteneciente al continente sudamericano. Para tal caso, de llegar a las finales un equipo que no pertenece al continente sudamericano, deberá indefectiblemente jugar su primer partido de local." English translation: "The Tournament shall invariably end in a country belonging to the South American continent. Therefore, provided that a team not belonging to the South American continent qualifies to the finals, it shall invariably play the first leg at its home.")

Matches

First leg
Near the end of the first half, Tigres defender Hugo Ayala left the game with an ankle injury. River Plate right-back Gabriel Mercado was booked soon after for a stamp on André-Pierre Gignac, leading him to miss the second leg. At the break, River manager Marcelo Gallardo made an attacking double substitution, withdrawing Rodrigo Mora and Tabaré Viúdez for Gonzalo Martínez and Nicolás Bertolo, but was also suspended after shouting at the fourth official. Despite Tigres having most of the possession and late opportunities from Juninho and Jürgen Damm, the game ended goalless.

Second leg
River opened the scoring at the end of the first half when recent signing Alario headed Leonel Vangioni's low cross from the left into the goal. At 8' Lucas Alario committed an illegal strong entry against the ankle of Guido Pizarro, foul that media later considered that deserved red card. Alario saw yellow card. At 25', Tigres had four players with yellow card, three of them defenders.

At 46' Ramiro Funes Mori committed another illegal strong entry, this time against Rafael Sóbis, foul that media also later considered that deserved red card. Funes Mori was amonestated. When Carlos Sánchez went down in the penalty area, he scored the resulting spot kick, shooting to the left of the goalkeeper to double the team's lead. Four minutes later, a corner kick from the right was headed by Ramiro Funes Mori through the legs of the goalkeeper to secure a 3–0 victory, River's first Copa Libertadores for 19 years. The match was played under a heavy rainfall and polemic arbitration.

See also
2016 Recopa Sudamericana

References

External links
 
Copa Libertadores 2015, CONMEBOL.com 

Finals
2015
Tigres UANL matches
Club Atlético River Plate matches
2014–15 in Mexican football
2015 in Argentine football
2015
2015